Tempo Beer Industries (Tempo) is Israel's largest brewer and the country's second-largest beverage company.

Products

Beers

Tempo produces three brands of pale lager:

Goldstar, which was acquired in a 1985 merger
Maccabee, also marketed in the United States and Europe
Nesher Malt, brewed in both alcoholic and non-alcoholic versions

Goldstar is a 4.9% ABV pale lager which has been produced since the 1950s. It is marketed as a dark lager beer (""), though it is pale golden in appearance. In January 2007, Tempo introduced 4% Goldstar Light with a commercial starring Moshe Datz, from the Israeli duet Duo Datz. The beer is certified kosher by the Chief Rabbi of Netanya, Israel.

Maccabee is a 4.9% ABV pale lager that was first brewed in 1968. It is distributed in Israel and is also marketed in the United States and Europe.

Nesher Malt was the first commercial beer to be brewed in Israel. It is produced in both alcoholic and non-alcoholic styles, and has been brewed since 1935.

Soft drinks
Tempo produces juice-based drinks under the Jump brand and is also the local bottler of PepsiCo soft drinks.

Distribution

Since 1992, Tempo has been an importer of Heineken lager, and in 2005 they became the sole distributor in Israel for Samuel Adams lager.
Heineken International owns a 40% share of Tempo, which has its main office in Netanya.

Barkan Wine Cellars
In September 2004, Tempo acquired a 39% controlling interest in Barkan Wine Cellars, which is Israel's second-largest winery. Barkan produces the Segal brand of wine.

Popular culture
Goldstar beer was referred to in the song "Tel Aviv" by Duran Duran in their 1981 album Duran Duran.
For some reason, at many American Reform Jewish summer camps an old Tempo commercial jingle is often sung. Tempo was once one of Israel's largest soft drink brands, with a line of drinks called Tempo Kan-Kan (טמפו קן-קן), which featured several flavors, such as orange and cola. Today, Tempo is Pepsi's Israeli bottler.

See also
 Beer in Israel
 Malt beer

References

External links

 Company web page

Beer in Israel
Drink companies of Israel
1952 establishments in Israel
Israeli brands